Indian Land Claims Settlements are settlements of Native American land claims by the United States Congress, codified in 25 U.S.C. ch. 19. 

In several instances, these settlements ended live claims of aboriginal title in the United States.  The first two—the Rhode Island Claims Settlement Act and the Maine Indian Claims Settlement Act—extinguished all aboriginal title in Rhode Island and Maine, respectively, following initial court rulings in the tribes' favor.  

The Mohegan Nation (Connecticut) Land Claims Settlement of 1994 also followed a judicial ruling in favor of a tribe, but did not extinguish all aboriginal title in the state. Other tribes had pending land claims.

The Passamaquoddy (1975), Narragansett I and II (1976), and Mohegan (1980, 1982) cases occurred in the U.S. Supreme Court's Oneida I (1974) decision, which held that there was federal subject-matter jurisdiction for such claims.

The Florida Indian (Miccosukee) Land Claims Settlement and Florida Indian (Seminole) Land Claims Settlement relate to water rights in the Everglades.

In Canada, these settlements involve First Nations.

List of settlements

Other compensated extinguishments in the US
Decisions of the Indian Claims Commission
Alaska Native Claims Settlement Act (ANCSA)
South Carolina v. Catawba Indian Tribe, 476 U.S. 498 (1986): settled for $50,000,000 by the Catawba Indian Tribe of South Carolina Land Claims Settlement Act of 1993, Pub. L. No. 103-116, 107 Stat 1118 (codified at 25 U.S.C. § 941)

See also
Australia
National Native Title Tribunal (NNTT)
Canada
Nunavut Land Claims Agreement
Sahtu Dene and Metis Comprehensive Land Claim Agreement
Yukon Land Claims
New Zealand
Treaty of Waitangi claims and settlements

Notes

References 
 (2001).
John C. Christie, Jr., The Catawba Indian Land Claim: A Giant Among Indian Land Claims, 24  173 (2000).
 (2002).
Nicole Friederichs, A Reason to Revisit Maine's Indian Claims Settlement Acts: The United Nations Declaration on the Rights of Indigenous Peoples, 35  497 (2011).
 (2004).
Granville Ganter, Sovereign Municipalities?
Gavin Kentch, A Corporate Culture? The Environmental Justice Challenges of the Alaska Native Claims Settlement Act, 81  813 (2012).
Dean J. Kotlowski, Out of the Woods: The Making of the Maine Indian Claims Settlement Act, 30  63 (2006).
Alfred R. Light, The Myth of Everglades Settlement, 11  55 (1998).
Barbara S. Monahan, Florida's Seminole Indian Land Claims Agreement: Vehicle for an Innovative Water Rights Compact, 15  341 (1991).

External links
Full text of 25 U.S.C. tit. 19

Aboriginal title in the United States
United States federal Native American legislation